Matt O'Brien (26 July 1910 – 12 November 1974) was a New Zealand cricketer. He played in fifteen first-class matches for Wellington from 1932 to 1944.

See also
 List of Wellington representative cricketers

References

External links
 

1910 births
1974 deaths
New Zealand cricketers
Wellington cricketers
Cricketers from Napier, New Zealand
North Island Army cricketers
New Zealand Services cricketers